A Taste of Extreme Divinity is the eleventh studio album by Swedish melodic death metal band Hypocrisy.It was released on 23 October 2009 in Europe and on 3 November in the United States. The North American version contains three bonus tracks.

Track listing

Personnel

Band members 
Peter Tägtgren – vocals, guitar
Mikael Hedlund – bass
Horgh (Reidar Horghagen) – drums

Charts

References 

2009 albums
Hypocrisy (band) albums
Nuclear Blast albums
Albums produced by Peter Tägtgren
Albums with cover art by Kristian Wåhlin